Coxwell may refer to any of the following:

Places 
Coxwell Avenue, a street in Toronto, Canada
Coxwell (TTC), a subway station in Toronto
Great Coxwell, a village in Berkshire, England 
Great Coxwell Barn
Little Coxwell, a village in Berkshire, England

People 
Henry Tracey Coxwell (1819-1900), an English aeronaut